Green monkey may refer to

Biology
 Green monkey (Chlorocebus sabaeus), also known as the Sabaeus monkey or the Callithrix monkey 
 Chlorocebus, sometimes called the African green monkey 
 Green monkey disease, the Marburg virus disease

Other
 Alphege, or the Green Monkey, fairy tale 
 The Green Monkey, an American Thoroughbred racehorse
 Green Monkeys, team designation within the Legends of the Hidden Temple children's game show

See also
 "Green Monkey Dreams", a 1996 short story by Isobelle Carmody

Animal common name disambiguation pages